The second season of Got to Dance - Tylko Taniec will begin in September 2012 Polsat. Dancers compete to win PLN 100,000.

The show airs on Polsat, also in HD, and is hosted by Maciej Dowbor, and Katarzyna Kępka The prize money is currently 100,000 PLN for the winning act.

Auditions
Every contestant had to perform on precasting. Then after moving on dancers were allowed to dance in front of show judges, who picked 30 finalists after all auditions.

Pre-casting will take place in following cities

2012 Polish television seasons